This is a list of episodes of TV series Sofia Residents in Excess with the original dates of broadcasting in Bulgaria on bTV channel. All of the times shown below are UTC+02:00 (local time).

Broadcast and episodes

Original broadcast

Season 1 
Synopsis:

Season 2 
Synopsis:

Season 3 
Synopsis:

Season 4 
Synopsis:

Season 5 
Synopsis:

Season 6 
Synopsis:

Season 7 
Synopsis:

Season 8 
Synopsis:

Season 9 
Synopsis:

Season 10 
Synopsis:

Season 11 
Synopsis:

Season 12 
Synopsis:

Sofia Residents